The 2014 Tour of Norway was the fourth edition of the Tour of Norway cycle race. It was a part of the 2014 UCI Europe Tour.

Schedule
There were 5 stages in the race.

Teams
There were 18 teams that competed in the race.

Stages

Stage 1
21 May 2014 — Larvik to Larvik,

Stage 2
22 May 2014 — Drøbak to Sarpsborg,

Stage 3
23 May 2014 — Årnes to Budor,

Stage 4
24 May 2014 — Brumunddal to Lillehammer, 

Notes

Stage 5
25 May 2014 — Gjøvik to Hønefoss–Eggemoen,

Classification leadership table

In the 2014 Tour of Norway, four different jerseys were awarded. For the general classification, calculated by adding each cyclist's finishing times on each stage, and allowing time bonuses (10, 6 and 4 seconds respectively) for the first three finishers on mass-start stages, the leader received a yellow jersey. Additionally, there were a points classification, awarding a green jersey, and mountains classification, the leadership of which was marked by a polka dot jersey. The fourth jersey represents the young rider classification, marked by a white jersey. This was decided the same way as the general classification, but only young riders were eligible. There was also classification for teams.

Standings

References

External links

Tour of Norway
Tour of Norway
2014 in Norwegian sport